The 2019–20 season saw Kaizer Chiefs, a professional football club from Johannesburg, Gauteng, South Africa, compete in the South African Premier Division, in which they finished second, two points behind champions Mamelodi Sundowns. They also competed in the Nedbank Cup and Telkom Knockout, where they were eliminated in the last 16 and semi-final respectively.

Background

Review

On 16 March 2020, all matches for the remainder of the week were postponed due to the COVID-19 pandemic, with matches later postponed indefinitely.

In June 2020, the league was given permission to resume, with it being announced the following month that the season would restart on 11 August 2020, with matches being played behind closed doors at neutral venues in Gauteng. It was announced that Chiefs would play their home matches at Orlando Stadium, the home ground of local rivals Orlando Pirates.

After spending most of the season at the top of the division, they eventually finished second after drawing 1–1 with Baroka in the final game of the season.

Competitions

South African Premier Division

League table

Matches

Nedbank Cup

Telkom Knockout

Transfers

Transfers in

Transfers out

Loans out

Player statistics

Appearances and goals

Notes

References

Kaizer Chiefs F.C. seasons
Kaizer Chiefs